The Wulin Academy of Arts is an independent research institute for Chinese arts and culture studies, located on the shores of the West Lake in Hangzhou, Zhejiang Province. It was founded in 1995 but, with antecedents dating back to the Southern Song Dynasty.

History
From the 1980s, a group of artists and scholars from China Academy of Art, Zhejiang University, Nankai University and Xiling Seal Art Society had discussed the idea of forming an independent institution for Chinese arts and culture studies that echoes to the Imperial Art Academy founded by Emperor Gaozong 800 years ago on the lakeside of Wulin (the ancient name of Hangzhou), and also, reconnecting to the Wulin School that founded in the Ming Dynasty by Lan Ying.

In 1995, The Dazhen National Institute was established at the antechamber of the Imperial Wenlan Library on the island of Solitary Hill as the predecessor of Wulin Academy.
In 1997, the archaeological excavation and restoration at the Imperial Library began and the Institute moved out, cooperated with the Government of Gongshu District and became Hushu Society of Arts. In the same year, members of Dazhen institute dismissed Hushu Society and established the Meilan Society of Arts for independence. The influence of Meilan Society had grown for rebuilding the disintegrated tradition of Chinese art that has been greatly damaged by the havoc of the New Culture Movement in mid 1910s and ten years' Cultural Revolution. In 2000 the government cancelled Meilan Society's license for 'political' reasons to suppress on independent studies and some of its members fled to Europe and America for extrication.

The Meilan Society of Arts reconstituted in May 2002 and renamed to Wulin Academy of Arts. In 2006, the academy relocated to the shores of West Lake where its first institute was established.

Research institutes
Wulin Academy of Arts covers three major academic divisions:

Activities
Guqin Concert at Wulin Academy
Spring and Summer Activities
Wulin Academy assists Zhejiang Provincial Sports Bureau to establish the Art Institute of Zhejiang Provincial Sports Bureau

References

External links
Wulin Academy Official Website

Research institutes in China
Chinese art
Art societies
1995 establishments in China